Acleris aurichalcana is a species of moth of the family Tortricidae. It is found in South Korea, China (Shensi), Japan and Russia (Amur).

The wingspan is about 20 mm.

The larvae feed on Tilia japonica, Tilia tuan, Tilia amurensis, Tilia maximowitziana and Lespedeza bicolor.

References

Moths described in 1865
aurichalcana
Moths of Asia